The Kaunas Hydroelectric Power Plant, located on the Nemunas River about  southeast of central Kaunas, Lithuania, was completed in 1960. Its dam created the Kaunas Reservoir. Owned by Lietuvos Energija, it operates in conjunction with the Kruonis Pumped Storage Plant.

The plant, which has a capacity of 101 megawatts. Supplies about 3% of the electrical demand in Lithuania.

A renovation was begun in 2005, with work to be performed in partnership with the multinational conglomerate Alstom. The first phase was completed in November 2008; completion is scheduled for the end of 2009.

References

External links

Hydroelectric power stations in Lithuania
Buildings and structures in Kaunas
Hydroelectric power stations built in the Soviet Union
Dams in Lithuania